Between the Lions is an American animated/live-action/puppet children's television series designed to promote reading. The show was a co-production between WGBH in Boston and Sirius Thinking, Ltd., in New York City, in association with Mississippi Public Broadcasting, the distributor from seasons 5–10, in Mississippi. The show won seven Daytime Emmy awards between 2001 and 2007. It is created by alumni of Sesame Street and several season 2 episodes, notably in the Dance in Smarty Pants music videos, had a few characters from Sesame Street guest appearing. The show ran from April 3, 2000 to November 22, 2010, taking the schedule slot held by The Puzzle Place upon the latter's debut.

Plot
The series focuses on a family of clumsy anthropomorphic lions operating and living in a large, busy library called, “The Barnaby B. Busterfield III Memorial Public Library” starring alongside characters such as Click, an electronic, anthropomorphic computer mouse, the Information Hen, who answers library calls, and Heath, a dinosaur who serves as the library’s thesaurus. The program's format is intended to promote literacy and reading; in each episode, the lions introduce a picture book to the audience and read it. Some episodes have featured adaptions of well-known folktales or ancient myths or fables, while others have featured popular storybooks such as Click, Clack, Moo: Cows that Type, or shown the lions learning or benefiting from the lessons presented by the story.

The series often features an array of educational segments formatted each in its own distinctive style, particularly parodies of well-known media redesigned educationally for younger audiences or simple animations, some sketches more repetitive than others. A distinctive feature of the series is that it is virtually never set outside of the library, as it usually chronicles the lions' experiences within it. A subplot features a pair of pigeons named Walter and Clay comically infuriating a living bust of the library's deceased founder, Barnaby B. Busterfield III, located in an upper section of the library, that is normally intended for comic relief.

After the fourth season, the series underwent a noticeable format change. Notably, the show consisted of two ten-minute shorts, each a condensation of an earlier episode, tied together and united around a theme. The series also began to focus on consonants instead of vowels. Old segments such as "Magic Time" "Sam Spud" and "The Monkey Pop-Up Theater" were replaced with new ones such as "Joy Learno" and "The Flying Trampolini Brothers". Later episodes shifted away from the earlier focus on reading, and stories were just told to tie into the theme of the episode. Major characters such as Busterfield, Heath, Walter, Clay, and Martha Reader vanished from the show as well, despite still appearing in the intro.

Episodes

Characters

Main
 Theo Lion is the owner of the library, Lionel and Leona's father, and Cleo's mate with a scruffy attitude, loud gravelly voice, and large appetite. He loves to eat meat and devours it all in one second. He loves to joke but also has a powerful roar and is proclaimed "the King of the Library". Theo has an unending love for storytelling and is always proud to show library patrons the best books available.
 Cleo Lion is the mother of the cubs, Theo's mate and the family hunter. She loves to read to her cubs and use the stories to teach them important life lessons. She has the alter ego of a country lion singer, Tammy Lionette. Cleo's hunting instincts also make her a good investigative reporter and she can track down any book in the building, regardless of genre. She also has a powerful roar.
 Lionel Lion is Theo and Cleo's seven-year-old first-grader son. He loves to read "Cliff Hanger" books and always looks forward to the next one, much to Leona's annoyance. Lionel can get flustered when his family embarrasses him when they are devouring their food or if he is reading a baby book to Leona, but he loves them just the same. Since Lionel is always so self-confident, he is often convinced he doesn't need any advice or help with his problems, but he always ends up needing it after all.
 Leona Lion is Theo and Cleo's four-year-old daughter. Leona is curious about everything and is preparing to read as well as her brother, Lionel. Unlike Lionel, she is more in touch with her feral instincts and always practices her pouncing and hunting on her brother or her father. While Lionel loves Cliff Hanger books, Leona hates them because of how predictable and repetitive they are.
 Barnaby B. Busterfield III is a grumpy rock statue who is the founder of the library, which is named after him, and lives on the second floor. He is often left annoyed by the antics of Walter and Clay Pigeon. Being a statue, he cannot go anywhere, so the pigeons and the viewers are the only ones to whom he can address his complaints. He is annoyed when anyone calls him "Buster" and when the announcer pesters him. He has the ability to open the top of his head. Busterfield is absent after Season 4.
 Walter and Clay Pigeon are the two birds that live in the library's dome with Busterfield. They conversely talk to and annoy him. Walter is the male pigeon and Clay is the female pigeon. Walter and Clay Pigeon are true urban birds, but let's just say that they're not the brightest lights in the sky——they manage to say complete sentences only with each other's help and someone else's help. (for example, the Pigeons say, "We are going roller...uh...skating."). Walter and Clay are absent after Season 4.
 Click is a female computer mouse shaped like the rodent of the same name. Click is technically skilled in that she can drag and drop objects and characters into and out of books and websites. When a character needs her, they only need to call out her name (usually screaming if it's an emergency) since she doesn't mind helping others and will do what they tell her to do. Her only hindrances are, being a computer mouse, she must always stay connected to a computer and that she is vulnerable to computer viruses, as shown in one episode. Click vanished for a while after the fourth season, but returned in the last couple of seasons.

Recurring
 Dr. Alexander Graham Nitwhite (often mispronounced as "Dr. Nitwit", which he hates being called, by his duck assistant, Watson and sometimes by other characters: a regular routine has Theo and Cleo saying hello to "Dr. Nitwit" and when they are corrected (Nitwhite) they proclaim "Right...") is a pelican scientist. In his skits, he announces to Watson that he's discovered "the only word in the entire English language" with a certain letter combination (which is nearly always related to the lesson of the whole episode). However, his "discoveries" always turn out to be incorrect, as Watson inadvertently points out; as such, his nickname is rather apt. His name is a pun on Alexander Graham Bell, the creator of the telephone.
 The Information Hen is the library's information specialist. Each time she appears, she gives information about the library and reading to various callers usually by telling a joke or singing a song. She appears in animated segments in Season Five.
 Heath the Thesaurus is the library's thesaurus who is literally a giant dinosaur (a sauropod dinosaur; Brontosaurus) as a pun on the word "thesaurus" or "the saurus". He lives in the basement and often shows up unexpectedly when a character asks about a homophonic word or when a situation is called for one. He was voiced by Tyler Bunch in Season 1 and Peter Linz from Season 2 onwards. Heath does not appear after the fourth season.
 Grandpa Lion is Cleo's father, Lionel and Leona's maternal grandfather and also the father-in-law of Theo. He visits the library in the episode Out in Outer Space and tells of his friend Ellen Ochoa, the first Hispanic American woman in Outer Space. Lionel and Leona even made a biography of Grandpa Lion. He was performed by Martin P. Robinson.
 Gus the Rabbit is Lionel's best friend who is on his school hopping team. He has a reading disability and is still learning. He was afraid to tell Lionel about his problem, but Lionel encouraged him to keep trying and ask for help when he needs it.
 Aunt Priscilla and Uncle Otto Lion are Lionel and Leona's aunt and uncle who were told by Leona that they had 3 new cubs in But Mama But in which Leona visited in the episode. Aunt Priscilla and Uncle Otto would be Cleo's younger sister and Cleo's brother-in-law, the maternal aunt and uncle of Lionel and Leona, and the sister-in-law and brother-in-law of Theo Lion.
 Announcer Bunny is a rabbit in a top hat who acts as the show's announcer. He has a microphone right next to his hat. He appears before the intro in the first four seasons, saying something like "Announcer Bunny Here! Don't touch that remote, here comes Between the Lions!", at which point a preview of a clip shown in the episode plays and then it goes back to him, saying "If you think that was fun, watch this!" and in the episodes with two segments from Seasons 5-10, he appears to introduce the next episode. He also appears to introduce Arty Smartypants in his segments "Magic Time With The Great Smartini", "Four Words Without Any Assistance Whatsoever" and "Not As Smart As A Puck" and also introduces other segments such as the segments with Bertice Berry (saying "Dr. Bertice Berry with the [letter sound] in [word]!"), Fred Says (in the later seasons (saying "And now, a word from Mr. Fred Newman!")) and Monkey Cheerleaders (saying "And now, it's time for those magnificent Monkey Cheerleaders!" while a megaphone appears in front of him before he says "...those magnificent Monkey Cheeleaders!", that bit of which he says through the megaphone). On one occasion, he introduced the Heath the Thesaurus song, "Ten Little Words" (saying "Heath the Thesaurus, Heath the Thesaurus, Heath the Thesaurus! I went to Announcer School."). In some episodes, after a segment with Clay and Walter Pigeon, he would appear to say "Ha, ha, ha! Pigeons, Don't you just love 'em?". In later seasons, he announced the funding for the show. The only time he ever appeared with the lions or in the Library was in The Goat in the Coat, where he appeared to translate for Sierra the Spanish-speaking mountain lion. 
 Arty Smartypants/The Great Smartini is a farcical and somewhat discombobulated bunraku puppet man with large overalls (which he refers to as his "smarty pants"). He is the star of two segments; Magic Time and Four Words. In the former, Arty puts on a magic show where he puts two to four words in his pants and says a magic word like ebracadebra, or oobracadoobra, then dances to his song – "Dance in Smarty Pants" – until he has made a compound word and demonstrating it by showing/interacting with the meaning of the word. Due to the popularity of his dance, a short music video was made that featured Arty and various characters from the show (or from other PBS Kids shows) wearing their own "smarty pants" and dancing to the song. In the latter segment, he reads "four words without any assistance whatsoever". Four words appear in each corner of the screen and he points to them first with his hands, then with his feet. After realizing that he is floating in the air, he comically comes crashing down. In later seasons, the segments were replaced with new ones; Short Stories, where Arty reads a small board book and Play with Words, where he Arty changes words into completely different ones.
 Smarmy Marmy Smartypants: Arty Smartypants' mother, who is also his assistant in the Great Smartini segments. While Arty himself doesn't visit the library, Marmy sometimes pops up every now and then to babysit the cubs or read a book to them. She can also be seen sometimes in the background. In the second to fourth seasons, Marmy hosts her own solo segments; "Swami Marmy", in which she plays a fortune teller who reads the future to some monkeys and Marmy's Poetry Corner, where she introduces some celebrities reading a poem from a book.

Cast

Main
 Bertice Berry – Herself
 Alison Fraser – Babs Caplan
 Denyce Graves – Herself
 Fred Newman – Letter sounds, various live-action and sound segments, Himself
 Ruth Westheimer – Dr. Ruth Wordheimer
 Akira Takayama – Livingston Dangerously
 Terry Bradshaw – Himself (Blending Bowl)
 Polly Adams – Molly Stewpot
 Albrecht Roser – Himself 
 Marc Brown – Himself 
 Rachel Dratch – Library Guest 
 Fred Armisen – Library Guest
 Sharon Bryant – Fonix member
 Nicki Richards – Fonix member
 Paulette McWilliams – Fonix member
 Cindy Mizelle - Fonix member
 Elisabeth Withers - Fonix member

Puppeteers
 Pam Arciero – Leona Lion (2002–2010), Dixie Chimps
 Anthony Asbury – Lionel Lion (2000–2008)
 Heather Asch – Clay Pigeon, Click the Mouse, Marmy Smartypants
 Jennifer Barnhart – Cleo Lion, Dixie Chimps, Monkey Singer, Leonard "Lenny" T. Lizzard 
 Lisa Buckley – Chelsea, Dixie Chimps
 Tyler Bunch – Walter Pigeon (2000), Heath the Thesaurus (2000), Dr. Nitwhite, Johnny, Vowel Boot Camp Letters 
 Cheryl Blaylock – Martha Reader (puppetry), Girl Monkey
 David Matthew Feldman – Monkeys, Ducks
 Ed Gale – Orlando
 Keri Horn – Kayree, The Cajun Hound Dog 
 James Kroupa – Walter Pigeon (2001–2003)
 Tim Lagasse – Arty Smartypants, Watson, Barnaby B. Busterfield III, Gus Rabbit, Theo Lion (Understudy during Seasons 3 and 4), Larry the Lost Rock (speaking voice), Steve the Bowling Ball, Sergeant Mark, Vowel Boot Camp Letters, Various Characters
 Peter Linz – Theo Lion, Heath the Thesaurus (2001–2002), Announcer Bunny
 Rick Lyon – Ted the Scientist Monkey
 Noel MacNeal – Lionel Lion (2009–2010)
 Kathryn Mullen – Leona Lion (2000–2001), Vowelles (puppetry), Information Hen  
 Jim Napolitano – Zak the Surfing Monkey
 Kenneth Neptune – Harry
 Carmen Osbahr – Sierra Lion, Vowelles (puppetry)
 Martin P. Robinson – Grandpa Lion
 Matt Vogel – Various Characters, Riffington from Reading is Fundamental (Designated Reader promo only)

Voice cast
 Jennifer Barnhart – Most female cartoon roles, Grey Hand
 Tyler Bunch – Cliff Hanger Narrator (Seasons 6-10), Various Announcers, Pheasant, and the Vacuum Cleaner Vendor
 Scott Dodson – Silver Knight, Ringmaster 
 Michael K. Frith – Red Knight, Cliff Hanger Narrator (Seasons 1-5), Sam Spud, Various Narrators
 Peter Linz – Gawain, Polly the Parrot, Boy in Opposite Bunny segments
 Fred Newman – Golf Announcer, Chicken Jane, Various Narrators, The Lucky Duck, The Boy Who Cried Wolf
 Richard O'Connor – Gold Knight
 Chris Phillips – Cliff Hanger (partially Tim Lagasse)
 Brian Schemmel – Blue Knight
 Miles Purinton – Jeremy 
 Jack Berner – Scot
 Kate Berner – Dot, Monica Maxwell
 Christiana Anbri
 Christopher Cerf - Larry the Lost Rock (singing voice)
 Emilio Delgado – The Ram
 Sonia Manzano – Doña Viv/Koyel

Guest stars 
Characters from other PBS Kids shows have appeared in Between the Lions. Three cast members of Zoom (Rachel Redd, Kenny Yates, and Kaleigh Cronin) have appeared, teaching viewers how to read the word "Zoom." Several Sesame Street Muppets made cameos in Season Two and in the “Dance in Smarty Pants” music video.

Al Roker, Jasmine Guy, Ossie Davis (along with his wife Ruby Dee), Bruno Kirby, Denyce Graves, Roma Downey, Vanessa Williams, and Jane Seymour as well as a few athletes have also made appearances to read words to the viewers, including basketball player Stephon Marbury. Joe Lynn Turner sang a few songs on the show. LeVar Burton also appeared alongside the cast in several PBS Kids promotional spots.

Segments
Between the Lions often makes wild parodies of (often children's) programming. The title itself is a double entendre in that it is a play on the phrase "between the lines" and that many classic library buildings have two lions separated by the main entrance. Thus in order to enter the library, one must go "between the lions". Some recurring segments include:

The Monkey Pop-Up Theater: A monkey with blonde hair (monkeys are often featured as background characters or library patrons in this series) opens a pop-up book which presents a zany musical performance by monkeys who sing in operatic voices.

The Vowelles: Three colored lips with satin gloves and wigs perform vowel songs for an audience. In the first few seasons, Click's hand would pick up the letters of a word from the book and transition them to their segment to establish the vowel and word family of the episode. The Vowelles are usually accompanied by Johnny Consananti and Martha Reader. In Season 1, the stage backdrop is not lit, leaving viewers to see only lips, and usually satin gloves and feather boas, and hair. In seasons 2–4, the dark stage background is replaced with a colorful silver background obviously revealing that The Vowelles are only three pairs of lips surrounded by wigs, and usually accompanied by satin gloves and feather boas, and the unidentified puppets in the audience are replaced with monkeys and Johnny Consananti is the announcer.NOTE: Martha Reader and The Vowelles is a parody of Martha Reeves and The Vandellas, a popular Motown group from the 1960s.

The Word Doctor with Dr. Ruth Wordheimer: Dr. Ruth Westheimer portrays "Dr. Ruth Wordheimer", a friendly therapist. Her two types of clients are:
 Monkeys who need help reading or understanding long or difficult words (they are having a "Long Word Freakout").
 Words that are dissatisfied with their current meaning. (By replacing certain well-chosen letters, Dr. Wordheimer is able to give the word a new meaning and a new lease on life.)

Little Wendy Tales: In an animesque segment, a girl with black hair tied in pigtails reads the misadventures found in Little Wendy Tales when sitting next to her white cat Cuddly Kitty on her bed. In classic fashion, the dark-haired girl and Cuddly Kitty transform themselves into The Punctuator and Emoticon the Cat (a parody of Sailor Moon, among other anime clichés) and saves Wendy by means of switching around the punctuation, altering the scene in the process. She rereads the altered adventures after correcting the sentences.

Fun with Chicken Jane: A parody of the famous Dick and Jane books for children. In this, two naive children, Scot and Dot, place themselves in harm's way. An intelligent chicken named Chicken Jane spells out an obvious solution to the problem. At the last moment, the children get out of the way and Chicken Jane gets hurt instead. The theme song is a parody of the old Alka Seltzer jingle. When the skit starts, Scot, Dot, and Chicken Jane come skipping down a dirt road to the jingle that goes "Look, look, see, see, coming down the lane. Here comes Scot, here comes Dot, here comes Chicken Jane!" When the skit is over, Scot and Dot headed back up the road (Chicken Jane limping along behind with an injured wing) to "Look, look, see, see, going up the lane. There goes Scot, there goes Dot, there goes Chicken Jane!". In the Episode, "Stop That Chicken", Chicken Jane once fell out of one of the books and ended up in several other books which are Colonial America, Sleeping Beauty, and Cook A Lot Like Me by Molly Stewpot (a reference to Martha Stewart). The very demanding chef Molly sees Chicken Jane and wants to use her in one of her recipes while ignoring what Chicken Jane is saying. The book is then swatted at in an attempt for Chicken Jane to come to life while jelly is spilled onto Molly in a defeat, and Leona succeeds in getting Chicken Jane back in her book.

The Adventures of Cliff Hanger: This common cartoon segment centers around Cliff Hanger, a lantern-jawed outdoorsman who is usually stranded hundreds of feet above the ground, holding onto a branch on the side of a cliff (hence the skit's title). Each episode presents Cliff with a preposterous situation of some kind, which he attempts to use to his advantage by reaching into his backpack, pulling out what he calls his "trusty survival manual", and following the instructions provided there. The instructions, though often highly unorthodox, usually prove successful, and Cliff briefly escapes from the cliff. But, inevitably, another highly unlikely incident sends Cliff back to where he started, hanging onto his branch once again. The cartoon then ends when the branch starts cracking as Cliff says his baleful catchphrase: "Can't... hold... on... much... longer!" and the sun sets. This scene occurs at the beginning of the cartoon as well. Similar to cartoons such as Wile E. Coyote and Road Runner, these cartoon clips follow the same storyline; although Cliff never gives up on trying to get off the cliff, he never succeeds. Each segment begins and usually ends with a theme song sung by a formally dressed group of singers that flies by in a helicopter, singing "Cliff Hanger, hanging from a cliff! And that's why he's called Cliff Hanger!" Cliff attempts to attract their attention to his predicament by calling out "Excuse me! Excuse me!", but to no avail. In one episode, he apparently succeeds at drawing their attention, and they rescue him, but it turns out he is simply dreaming. He once got off the cliff when he jumped on a whale's blowhole and washed up on a beach in "The Last Cliff Hanger" and Lionel is upset about the last book, but eventually missed his cliff and, through a series of bizarre events (thanks to the writer, Livingston Dangerously), got himself back onto it. His name is a play on the media term "cliffhanger" which is often shown on non-Between the Lions episodes as "to be continued".

In three episodes Cliff Hanger and the Solid Oil Lamp, Cliff Hanger Meets the Sleeping Gypsy, and Cliff Hanger and the Sheep on a Ship, Cliff Hanger imagines he is in a restaurant eating steak, he is in a bathtub and a starstruck door.

In another episode, Lionel's friend Lenny, a lizard, introduces a similarly styled series of books called Justin Time, about a stereotypical explorer named Justin Time who relaxes in a hammock until an absurd scenario like those of Cliff Hanger occurs, forcing him to intervene to restore the calm, boasting, "Couldn't be more comfortable." He too used a version of the Survival Manual, called a Safety Manual, which is from his Survival Kit, a version of Cliff Hanger's backpack and the same formally dressed chorus, riding in the back of a Pickup truck introduces him at the beginning of the story, Singing "Justin Time, he's always saved just in time! And that is why he is called Justin Time!" Then Justin rudely tells the singers "Go away!" Ironically, Lionel disliked this series. Only one Justin Time segment was ever shown as it only appeared in one episode. In the series, the character Lionel is a fan of Cliff Hanger books, which his sister Leona thinks are pointless. But, even in episodes where she expresses hatred, she has shown respect for it, such as when she decided to help Lionel get Livingston Dangerously to write more books.

Gawain's Word: A Wayne's World spoof hosted by a knight with an American surfer accent, featuring two jousting knights charging at each other, each touting a speech balloon with half of a word which then became their respective names, then demonstrating the word. For example, one skit featured "Sir Sh" dressed in silver armor and "Sir Ark" dressed in gold armor. Then Gawain says, "Blend on, dudes!" when it is time to put the halves together. When Sir Sh bumps into Sir Ark, their speech balloons meld together to form the word "shark." Then they react to the word, by running away from a hovering shark. Though the title of the segment clearly is a parody of the Saturday Night Live skit, the two knights in the segment speak more characteristically like Bill and Ted from Bill & Ted's Excellent Adventure than Wayne and Garth from Wayne's World.

Tiger Words: A pun of golfer Tiger Woods. Tiger is always seen participating in a spelling competition (modeled off a golf tournament), where he always misspell a word. While the crowd and announcer are surprised and dismayed at his error, Tiger corrects his mistake by using another tool in his pencil bag (using an eraser to fix mistakes in pencil, or paint to fix mistakes in pen, for example). Tiger correctly spells the word and wins the championship.

Sam Spud: Par-Boiled Potato Detective: A spoof of the Sam Spade detective stories, this segment portrays a par-boiled potato (voiced by Michael K. Frith) who types out the voice-over narration typical of film noir on a late night, making and correcting typographical errors that demonstrate word sounds. This segment makes heavy use of sight gags based on wordplay (such as the narrator referring to the entrance of a "tomato"—1930s slang for an attractive woman—who is revealed to be a real tomato wearing a costume; or a neon sign that blinks the words "Flicker Flicker" or "On" and "Off"). In most cases, the segments would end with a live-action African-American or Caucasian boy or girl watching Sam Spud on television and calling out to his or her mother that "there's a talking potato with a hat on and no mouth!" (or some variation), and the mother calling from offscreen telling her child not to worry and that it's educational television, so it must be good for him/her. On one occasion, it ends with the mother saying that it is not nice to say "dumb", after a girl was describing a pickle with a zipper.

The Un-People: This cartoon is aimed at teaching kids their prefixes. The main character is "young" Monica Maxwell, a girl about 8 years-old who seems to have an inordinate amount of trouble with a group of rambunctious rhinos or other misfortunes. The segment always begins with the rhinos running amok (or other non-rhino related situations, such as when Monica marches down a street in a parade) usually in Monica's house. The clever, resourceful girl somehow manages to subdue or round up the rhinos, for example, putting them in a zippered bag (not all these segments have relationship with rhinos.)   All of a sudden, the evil Un-People come along and "un-zip" the bag, causing the rhinos to run free again and resume their rampage of destruction (or other misfortune not caused by the animals.) But when the crime-fighting Re-People appear, they "re-zip" the bag and the destruction of the charging rhinos stops, or other misfortune-quelling results. This segment may be considered a parody of common superhero-themed cartoons such as the Justice League. There are at least two skits that did not feature rhinos—the "undressed"/"redressed" skit where a marching band is seen without clothes, only to get redressed in their outfits, and the "unbuttoned"/"rebuttoned" skit where Monica is seen playing in the snow, with her coat becoming unbuttoned and then finally rebuttoned.

Silent E: A sly criminal, Silent E, has the ability to make the vowel sounds say their names and changes the words without a silent e into words with a silent e, for example: he changes a cub (which resembles Leona) into a cube, a tub into a tube, a twin into twine and a can into a cane. In each segment, Silent E is carted off to jail by a policeman. Silent E then writes a note to the policeman, which usually reads something like, "Sure do like that pin/cap you're wearing! I would love to get a closer look!" The policeman then remarks, "Well, sure! I don't see any harm in that!" The policeman hands the object to Silent E, who then easily escapes by using either the policeman's pin and turning it into a pine to climb out the window or the policeman's cap and turning it into a cape to fly out the window. Either way, after that, the policeman shouts, "Well, Silent E, you may have slipped out of my grasp this time, but mark my words: I'll get you YET!!!!"

Dr. Nitwhite: This sketch usually begins with Dr. Nitwhite ordering in his assistant, Watson (the character most guilty of calling him "Dr. Nitwit"), for Nitwhite claims he has discovered "the only word in the entire English language!" with a particular letter combination in it, showing extreme pride in his achievement. Unfortunately for Nitwhite, Watson casually utters an expression or sentence containing another word with that same combination (for example, in one sketch, Nitwhite proudly presents what he claims to be the only two-letter word with the short 'I' sound: in. An impressed Watson remarks, "Dr. Nitwhite! This time, I think you have really done it!"). After Nitwhite realizes this, he breaks down and advises Watson to leave, which the latter does, calling him "Dr. Nitwit" once more.

Vowel Boot Camp: In this segment, the soldiers, who are lowercase vowels (except the drill sergeant, who is an exclamation point and is revealed to be aptly named Sergeant Mark in one sketch), practice making their sounds and then go out to make words. The famous catchphrase is "This isn't Camp Nappy Packy Wacky Lake/Camp Easy Peasy Eat-a-lot/Camp Itty Bitty Kitty Time/Camp Hoppa Woppa Coppa Nope/Camp Gummy Wummy Cutie-pie; this is Vowel Boot Camp!" In three skits, the lowercase "I" soldier is seen missing a dot before being corrected by the drill instructor, the "U" soldier is seen upside down, looking like a lowercase "N" before being corrected by the drill sergeant to set his head to the proper position and the "O" soldier has a pillow from his footlocker in his mouth before the sergeant (who had told him this on several prior occasions) tells him to spit it out, which he does. Portions of this segment deal with silent "E" and letters containing two vowels. For example, the "I" soldier is accompanied by two letters, "R" and "P" to form "rip" until the "E" is added at the end of the word to turn the word into "ripe". The drill sergeant then asks the soldiers regarding the rule prompting the soldiers to sing the tune "When "E" on the end plays a no-talking game, the vowel before it says its name." Another example is when the "A" soldier is sandwiched between two lowercase consonants "M" and "N" to form the word "man". However the "I" soldier comes into the word to change it into "main". The drill sergeant then asks the other vowels regarding the rule, prompting them to sing the tune "When two vowels stand side by side, the first one says its name with pride." The sergeant always ends up getting trampled by the vowels as they leave. On one occasion, he misses them, but they end up shutting the door on him, locking him in, causing him to bang on the door.

The Lone Rearranger Rewrites Again: A spoof of The Lone Ranger, this animated segment features an intelligent, banana nose cowboy named The Lone Rerranger, (or Lone for short), with his horse Hiho, and his sidekick whose name is Russell-Upsome Grub, and a sentence which needs to be rearranged. For example, "Horses must ride cowboys into the corral" needs to be rearranged to say "Cowboys must ride horses into the corral". After Lone fixes the sentence with his whip, he, Hiho, and Russell leave and the people who did what the original sign said for them to do never get a chance to thank him or Russell, or something loosely related to the subject. Afterwards, the segment would end with Lone on top of Hiho yelling, "Hi-yo, Hiho! Away!", and then the camera would pan to Russell, who was seen covering his ears and then saying, "Why you must you always yell in that poor horsey's ears?"

Moby Duck: A spoof of Moby-Dick, this takes place in a peapod (spoof of Pequod) where there are two captains. The first is Captain Starbuck, the second Captain Ahab. Starbuck looks through a telescope and sees a white animal and yells, "Wait, Cap'n! Thar she quacks! Moby, the great white duck!" Captain Ahab takes a closer look and gives the tagline "Nay, Mr. Starbuck! That not be Moby, the great white duck! Argh!", and explains the differences and sounds out syllables, showing, for example, Daisy, the entertaining white snail. The two admit defeat before continuing their search. A running gag is the fact that they never look behind them, which is exactly where Moby is. Another running gag would feature an onscreen assistant throwing water into the face of Ahab, humiliating him. The author is said to be "Melvin Hermille", a spoof of Moby Dick author Herman Melville.

Blending Bowl: A kind of "bowl game" in which NFL players blend sounds to make words. It stars former NFL superstar quarterback turned FOX Sports co-host Terry Bradshaw as a commentator. It is similar to Gawain's Word and Blend Mart but with a football setting.

Opposite Bunny: A superhero bunny who saves the day by turning bad things happening in the neighborhood back into good things. The segment ends with the neighbors reviewing the opposites. For example, one episode has the neighbors saying, "First it was raw; now it is cooked. How does that bunny do it?!"

Swami Marmy: This segment features Smarmy Marmy as a fortune teller who tells monkeys their future. In one segment, she tells a monkey that his sister will drop in for a visit, after which she literally, drops in from above. In another segment, she simply tells a monkey "Oops!" after which Marmy knocks her crystal ball off the table and it rolls off and breaks.

Fred Says: Fred Newman portraying himself appears onscreen sounding out a word syllable by syllable after which he acts it or demonstrates it in his usual humor by attaching sounds to each syllable. On multiple occasions, Fred would appear doing his segment twice in the first season.

What's Cooking?: A cooking segment starring Theo and Cleo Lion as chefs. In each segment, they have a recipe and all the things they need (and a few they do not need) in front of them with their names on them (For example, slammed and rammed ham with no yam or clam). They read the recipe step-by-step which usually involves getting rid of the extra ingredients and doing something (rather literally) to the main item before placing it in something. When they reach the last step, which involves cooking the food for a certain amount of time, they just say "Nah" and eat it raw. Sometimes, the camera zooms in on the refrigerator and segues into a Sam Spud segment.

The Joy Learno Show: Female Parody of Jay Leno talks to various guests about words and their meanings.

Replacing Letter Songs: Each song for the vowels such as "a" and "e", etc. This is sung in different words such as "Ben" and "hen". At the end, a letter is replaced such as "t" and changes a letter to "ten". Heath the Thesarus would sometimes introduce the segment by saying, "And now, a little poem in which letters change. And make something very interesting happen."

Marmy's Poetry Corner: This segment features Marmy with guest stars.

Educational content
Between the Lions focuses on teaching reading and a love of books to young children in a fun, informative way.

Among the educational techniques used by Between the Lions are the following:
 Featured Letters and Sounds – Every episode has a feature letter or sound, such as 'h' or 'the long ee sound'. Throughout the show, the featured letter or sound is heard and seen in a variety of words. In seasons 7 and 8, an ad shows what's coming up next followed by a hand grabbing a letter from the word, usually from the first book.
 Text on Screen – Frequently, keywords or entire sentences of dialog are shown on screen as the characters talk, with the featured letter or combination highlighted. The gray glove then grabs or puts it back in its place after its segment.
 Stories – Every episode contains one or more short stories in the form of books read by the Lion family. These stories tie in thematically with the rest of the episode and also serve as another way to present words with the featured sound in context. Sometimes the stories are real books (like "Sylvester and the Magic Pebble" by William Steig, "Joseph Had a Little Overcoat" by Simms Taback, and "The Carrot Seed" by Ruth Krauss) or well-known tales (like "Rumplestiltskin", "The Little Red Hen", and "The Gingerbread Man"); other times they are books that are made-up to fit the episode (like How Pecos Bill Cleans Up the West and Lionel's favorite book, Nothing but Lug Nuts).
 Songs – Silly but informative songs sum up the rules of English spelling and pronunciation in easy-to-remember ways, with lyrics like "When two vowels go walking, the first one does the talking" or "Even the blues would be blue without an s" and many others. Often the text of the song is shown on screen. The songs for the show are by Thomas Z. Shepard, Christopher Cerf, Sarah Durkee and Paul Jacobs.
 Animations and skits – A variety of animations and skits show how words are formed and how one word can be changed into another by adding or removing letters.
 Definitions – Whenever a long or unusual word is used in a dialog or story, a quick definition is given. Usually, it is subtly worked into the conversation, such as when one of the parents responds to a question from the children. Other times it may be provided in a humorous way, such as when Heath Thesaurus pokes his head in to define a word. Occasionally, words may be defined by showing pictures or other artistic methods.
 Repeated Vocabulary – Various vocabulary words are introduced in each episode, ranging from simple, everyday concepts like "jump" and "read" to more complex words like "sequel", "dictionary", or "drought". After a word has been introduced, it is usually used a number of times throughout the episode.

In addition to teaching basic reading, pronunciation, and grammar skills, Between the Lions also strives to promote a general love of reading in its viewers. It explores the many subjects that books can cover and shows how different people may enjoy reading different things. It also demonstrates the value of reference books and the importance of reading in other everyday activities like using a computer, cooking with a recipe, or finding your way with street signs.

Some Between the Lions episodes also deal with larger episodes related to literary matters: How to handle the scary parts of a story, for example, or the fact that it's okay to be a little sad or scared if something bad happens to a character that you like in a book. It also shows how children can use books as jumping points for their own imagination.

Above all, every character on the show expresses a contagious enthusiasm for reading, with the underlying message being "Reading is cool".

The show's curriculum director, Linda Rath, not only had been a working elementary-schoolteacher for many years specializing in reading but also has a PhD from the Harvard Graduate School of Education (where she obtained a master's before becoming a schoolteacher), working with reading specialist professor Jeanne Chall. The program's educational effectiveness have been researched in several studies.

Emmy Awards 
The series won many Emmy Awards.  A more complete list is available from IMDb's page, Awards for "Between the Lions".  These awards include:

Outstanding Pre-School Children's Series – 2009

Executive Producers: Judith Stoia, Christopher Cerf, Norman Stiles, Brigid Sullivan.
Series Producer: Beth Kirsch.
Coordinating Producer: Rick Klein, Bill Berner, Diane Hartman, Chris Cardillo, Philippa Hall.
Producer: Scott Colwell, Carol Klein.

Outstanding Writing in a Children's Series – 2008 & 2009

Norman Stiles, Ray Messecar, Peter K. Hirsch, Brian Meehl, Jennifer Hamburg, Sarah Durkee, Luis Santeiro, Christopher Cerf, Beth Kirsch, Fred Newman, Judith Stoia, Candy Kugel (PBS)

Outstanding Achievement in Music Direction and Composition – 2008 Nomination

Paul Jacobs, Sarah Durkee, Christopher Cerf

Outstanding Achievement in Art Direction/Set Decoration/Scenic Design – 2008 Nomination

Christopher Cerf, Norman Stiles, Judith Stoia, Brigid Sullivan, Bill Berner, Chris Cardillo, Philippa Hall, Diane Hartman, Rick Klein, Scott Colwell, Beth Kirsch, Carol Klein (PBS)

Outstanding Pre-School Children's Series – 2008 Nomination

Laura Brock, Karen Wing, Jerel Levanway, Bill Reinhart, Jack Thomas, Mary Goodson, Ray Green, Jimmy Thrasher (PBS)

Composition – 2008 Nomination

Paul Jacobs, Sarah Durkee, Christopher Cerf (PBS)

Broadcast 
Between the Lions is no longer shown on PBS Kids in United States. According to tvguide.com, it is currently not available to any streaming platform.

Reruns stopped on August 31, 2011.

See also 
 The Electric Company
 Bear In The Big Blue House
 Elmo's World
 Reading Rainbow
 The Electric Company
 Sesame Street
 The Puzzle Place

References 

R.I.P

https://www.tvguide.com/tvshows/between-the-lions/1030129115/

External links 
 Office website (archive)
 

2000 American television series debuts
2010 American television series endings
2000s American animated television series
2010s American animated television series
2000s American children's comedy television series
2010s American children's comedy television series
2000s American musical comedy television series
2010s American musical comedy television series
2000s American sketch comedy television series
2010s American sketch comedy television series
American children's animated adventure television series
American children's animated comedy television series
American children's animated education television series
American children's animated fantasy television series
American children's animated musical television series
American television shows featuring puppetry
American television series with live action and animation
Animated television series about children
Animated television series about families
Animated television series about lions
Children's sketch comedy
English-language education television programming
PBS Kids shows
PBS original programming
Reading and literacy television series
Television series by WGBH
Television shows filmed in New York (state)
Works set in libraries
Elementary school television series